The Lenin District is a district of the capital city of Bishkek in northern Kyrgyzstan. Its resident population was 198,019 in 2009. It covers the southwestern part of the city, and includes the urban-type settlement Chong-Aryk and the village Orto-Say.

Demographics

Ethnic composition
According to the 2009 Census, the ethnic composition (residential population) of the Lenin District was:

References 

Districts of Kyrgyzstan
Bishkek